Dismorphia boliviana is a butterfly in the  family Pieridae. It is found in Bolivia.

Adults have white undersides that are mottled in grey and yellow.

References

Dismorphiinae
Pieridae of South America
Endemic fauna of Bolivia
Butterflies described in 1955